Shahrak-e Jahadabad (also Romanized as Shahrak-e Jahādābād; also known as Jahādābād) is a village in Juyom Rural District, Juyom District, Larestan County, Fars Province, Iran. At the 2006 census, its population was 483, in 101 families.

References 

Populated places in Larestan County